Andreas Seppi was the defending champion, but lost in the semifinals to Mikhail Kukushkin.
Richard Gasquet won the title, defeating Kukushkin in the final, 4–6, 6–4, 6–4.

Seeds
The first four seeds received a bye into the second round.

Draw

Finals

Top half

Bottom half

Qualifying

Seeds

Qualifiers

Qualifying draw

First qualifier

Second qualifier

Third qualifier

Fourth qualifier

References
 Main Draw
 Qualifying Draw

Kremlin Cup - Singles
2013 Men's Singles